The Upper Bluffton Bridge was a historic structure located in Bluffton, Iowa, United States. This bridge was designed, fabricated and built by the Wrought Iron Bridge Company of Canton, Ohio for $2,831.23. This and the Lawrence Bridge were built at the same time, and it marked the first time that Winneshiek County had longer-span trusses built at rural river crossings instead of the smaller bowstring truss bridges. This bridge was listed on the National Register of Historic Places in 1998. It was closed to traffic because of structural problems, and replaced in 2011. Plans at that time were to move the structure to the Millgrove Access Wildlife Area in Poweshiek County, Iowa. However, the move was not made and the structure was replaced with some parts of the original structure being repurposed on a bridge on the Trout Run Bike Trail around Decorah. A plaque was placed adjacent to the new structure in Bluffton commemorating the original structure .

References

Bridges completed in 1880
Bridges in Winneshiek County, Iowa
National Register of Historic Places in Winneshiek County, Iowa
Road bridges on the National Register of Historic Places in Iowa
Truss bridges in Iowa
Wrought iron bridges in the United States
Pratt truss bridges in the United States